The June 2022 South Korean by-elections for seven constituencies of the National Assembly were held in South Korea simultaneously with local elections on June 1, 2022. 

Lee Jae-myung of the Democratic Party and Ahn Cheol-soo of the People Power Party, former candidates in the 2022 South Korean presidential election, ran successfully in the by-election for one of the constituencies.

Reasons for by-elections 

The following Members of National Assembly lost or resigned from their seats:
 Daegu Suseong District B: Hong Joon-pyo (People Power Party), resigned to run as a candidate in the 2022 South Korean presidential election, but he lost the party's primaries to Yoon Suk-yeol. Later, Hong launched his candidacy for the 2022 Daegu mayoral election.
 Incheon Gyeyang District B: Song Young-gil (Democratic Party), as the Democratic Party's chairman, resigned after Lee Jae-myung was defeated in the presidential election. Song later launched his candidacy for the 2022 Seoul mayoral election.
 Seongnam Bundang-gu A: Kim Eun-hye (People Power Party), resigned to run as a candidate for the governor of the Gyeonggi Province in the 2022 South Korean local elections.
 Jeju B: Oh Young-hun (Democratic Party), resigned to run as a candidate for the governor of the Jeju Province in the local elections.
 Seocheon Boryeong: Kim Tae-heum (People Power Party), resigned to run as a candidate for the governor of the South Chungcheong Province in the local elections.
 Changwon Uichang-gu: Park Wan-su (People Power Party), resigned to run as a candidate for the governor of the South Gyeongsang Province in the local elections.
 Gangwon Wonju 1st: Lee Kwang-jae (Democratic Party), as member of Lee Nak-yeon presidential campaign committee, resigned after Lee Nak-yeon lost the party's primaries to Lee Jae-myung. Later, Lee launched his candidacy for the governor of the Gangwon Province in the local elections.

List of constituencies and candidates

Results

Daegu Suseong

Incheon Gyeyang

Seongnam Bundang-gu

Jeju

Seocheon Boryeong

Changwon Uichang-gu

Gangwon Wonju

References

2022 elections in South Korea
2022 South Korean by-elections
June 2022 events in South Korea